Selim Mouzannar (born February 5, 1963) is a French-Lebanese jeweler and civic activist. He is the founder and CEO of Selim Mouzannar, his eponymous jewellery house and artisanal manufacturing corporation based in Beirut, Lebanon.

Biography 

Scion of a family of renowned craftsman originally from Damascus, Mouzannar was shaped by training at his father's jewelry shop in Beirut's old souks during the heyday of Lebanon's cosmopolitan makeup.

In 1980, Mouzannar left Lebanon in the midst of the Lebanese civil war and went to study in Paris, France. He graduated with a degree in mineralogy and gemology in 1983, coupled with an internship in the Diamonds’ market in Antwerp, Belgium.
 
From 1984, Mouzannar worked as a production and purchasing manager for a renowned jeweler based in Saudi Arabia. In 1989, he moved to Bangkok, Thailand, managing an international workshop. In the late 1980s, he spent 6 months at the Thai-Cambodian border working in a Ruby mine before deciding to leave the Far-East.

In 1990, Mouzannar headed back to Paris, France where he acquired additional mineralogy expertise from Institut National de Gemmologie. 
He returned to Beirut, Lebanon in 1993 to establish his own jewelry brand, Maison Selim Mouzannar. 
Mouzannar opened his workshop followed by his flagship store 5 years later in Beirut.

Following the 2006 war over Lebanon, Mouzannar launched a new strategy in order to expand his brand internationally and participated in worldwide exhibitions.

In 2012, he received a certification in Jewelry Design from the GIA Gemological Institute of America, followed by a certificate from the École supérieure des affaires (Beirut) Lebanon) in Marketing De Luxe in 2014.

Mouzannar is known for his crafting technique, known as 'Falamenk' ("Flemish" in Arabic), which combines rose-cut diamonds, with silver-bottomed bezel settings.

Several celebrities have been seen and featured wearing jewels designed by Selim Mouzannar, such as pop star Rihanna, actress Gwyneth Paltrow, Emma Stone at the opening of the Venice Film Festival in 2016, Jennifer Lawrence when promoting her movie Passenger in Seoul in December 2016., French actress Isabelle Adjani during a visit in Beirut in 2017, and Star Wars's new trilogy vedette Daisy Riddley on the movie promo tour in December 2017.

In 2016, Mouzannar created the 'Amal' Necklace, composed of emeralds of varying sizes and reflections. Amal won the "Best in Colored Gemstones" category of the Couture Award in Las Vegas, and was named as one of "30 breathtaking jewels" by Forbes for the year 2016.

Achievements 

2010, Mouzannar is amongst five Middle East jewelry designers who featured at a Christie's auction.

2011, Selim is nominated as one of the best 5 jewelry designers of the year by Elle Style Awards during a ceremony held in Istanbul, Turkey.

2012, Selim is designated as one of the best 10 designers for the ‘Great Designers’ award by the World Gold Council.

2014, Mouzannar is designated amongst the 30 Lebanese who emerged and influenced Lebanon in 2014.

2016, Mouzannar's necklace 'Amal' was named as one of "30 breathtaking jewels" by Forbes for the year 2016.

Awards 

2016, Mouzannar wins the "Best in Colored Gemstones" category of the Couture Award in Las Vegas for his "Amal" Necklace. "Amal" (which means hope in Arabic) stages 47 emeralds from the Colombian mine of Muzo, crimped on hexagonal bases, among which are placed 8 trapiche emeralds.

Community 

As a member of the Executive Committee of Achrafieh2020, a citizen-led environmental initiative to reinvent Beirut's historic neighborhood of Ashrafieh as a sustainable and livable space, and as a joint founder of Right to Nonviolence, a NGO based in Beirut, focused on legal activism and advocacy, Mouzannar developed his involvement in the community as an extension of his profession.

Mouzannar was involved in the nonviolent Cedar Revolution of 2005 that forced the departure of the Syrian military from Lebanon.

A profile in the International Herald Tribune headlined ‘Translating violence into wearable beauty’ pointed to the cross-culture  of Mouzannar's collection.

Latest Articles 

Madame Figaro 

L’Orient-Le Jour 

L’Officiel Maroc 

Ici Beyrouth 

The New York Times 

Marie Claire

Collections 

Aïda
- Beirut, Beirut Art Déco, Beirut Key
- Fish for Love
- Heritage, Fortune, Kastak
- Istanbul
- Link
- Mina
- Mille et une Nuits
- Mediterraneo, Hydra, Sunset, Plage de Galets
- Moon, Terra
- Rose de France
- Sea Flowers
- S Basilisk
- Transparence

Boutique / Points of Sales
Selim Mouzannar, Ashrafieh, Beirut, Lebanon 
Estate Jewellery, Ashrafieh, Beirut, Lebanon
 Macle Jewel Collective, Ashrafieh, Beirut, Lebanon
Broken English, New York, United States of America 
Elisabeth Anthony, Houston, USA 
Mario’s, Portland, USA 
Marissa Collections, Florida & Naples, USA 
Mitchells, Westport, USA 
Reinhold Jewelers, Puerto Rico, USA 
Richards, Greenwich, USA
Tayloe Piggott Jewelry, Jackson, USA 
YLang 23, Dallas, USA 
Addict Store, Nice, France
By Marie, Paris, France
Casanera, Bastia, France USA 
Ferret, Monaco, France 
Le Bon Marche, Paris, France
Dover Street Market London, United Kingdom
Fortnum & Mason, London, United Kingdom
Liberty London, United Kingdom
Midnight, Istanbul, Turkey
Neyleen Fine Jewellery, Casablanca, Morocco 
Uzerai, Warszawa, Poland 
Lane Crawford IFC, Central, Honk Kong 
Lane Crawford Canton Road, Tsim Sha Tsui, Honk Kong
Online: NetaPorter.com 
Online: MatchesFashion.com 
Online: Olivela.com

References

External links 

Selim Mouzannar

Living people
1963 births
Lebanese fashion designers
Lebanese activists
Artists from Beirut
Businesspeople from Paris
Lebanese emigrants to France
Jewellery designers